{{DISPLAYTITLE:C12H21N}}
The molecular formula C12H21N (molar mass: 179.30 g/mol, exact mass: 179.1674 u) may refer to:

 Memantine, a novel class of Alzheimer's disease medications
 Rimantadine, an antiviral drug